The International Union for Science Communicators (IUSC) mission is to bring into co-operation, groups and individuals through the world (developed as well as developing regions) who are interested in promoting the dissemination of science amongst the public and in particular amongst children, for furthering scientific knowledge among society and for eradication of resort to irrational beliefs.

The IUSC alerts society against the misuse of science, which result in threats to peace and to social and cultural diversities. It will help society to make use of science in defense of solidarity, tolerance, social justice and equality.

Office bearers of IUSC

See also 

 The Open Notebook

Science writing organizations